The Eastern Military Command ( or CML) is one of eight Military Commands of the Brazilian Army. The Eastern Military Command is responsible for the defence of the states Rio de Janeiro, Minas Gerais and Espírito Santo. A Parachutist Brigade (the Brigada de Infantaria Pára-quedista) and two Infantry Brigades are assigned to the 1st Army Division, which is the CMLs manoeuvre unit. Two Military Regional Commands are subordinated to the CML for administrative purposes.

Current Structure 

 Eastern Military Command (Comando do Comando Militar do Leste) in Rio de Janeiro
 HQ Company Eastern Military Command (Companhia de Comando do Comando Militar do Leste) in Rio de Janeiro
 1st Foot Guard Battalion (1º Batalhão de Guardas) in Rio de Janeiro
 2nd Guard Cavalry Regiment (2º Regimento de Cavalaria de Guarda) in Rio de Janeiro
 1st Military Police Battalion (1º Batalhão de Polícia do Exército) in Rio de Janeiro
 2nd Military Intelligence Company (2ª Companhia de Inteligência) in Rio de Janeiro
 1st Military Region (1ª Região Militar) in Rio de Janeiro covering the Rio de Janeiro and Espírito Santo states
 HQ Company 1st Military Region (Companhia de Comando da 1ª Região Militar) in Rio de Janeiro
 1st Military Region Regional Maintenance Park (Parque Regional de Manutenção da 1ª Região Militar) in Rio de Janeiro
 111th War Materiel Support Company (111ª Companhia de Apoio de Material Bélico) in Rio de Janeiro
 2nd Military Service Circumscription (2ª Circunscrição de Serviço Militar) in Rio de Janeiro
 Army Central Hospital (Hospital Central do Exército) in Rio de Janeiro
 Rio de Janeiro Garrison Hospital (Hospital da Guarnição de Rio de Janeiro) in Rio de Janeiro
 Military Polyclinic Rio de Janeiro (Policlínica Militar do Rio de Janeiro) in Rio de Janeiro
 Military Polyclinic Niterói (Policlínica Militar do Niterói) in Niterói
 4th Military Region (4ª Região Militar) in Belo Horizonte covering the Minas Gerais state (without the Triângulo Mineiro area)
 HQ Company 4th Military Region (Companhia de Comando da 4ª Região Militar) in Belo Horizonte
 12th Infantry Battalion (12º Batalhão de Infantaria) in Belo Horizonte
 55th Infantry Battalion (55º Batalhão de Infantaria) in Montes Claros
 4th Military Police Company (4ª Companhia de Polícia do Exército) in Belo Horizonte
 Juiz de Fora Garrison Hospital (Hospital da Guarnição de Juiz de Fora) in Juiz de Fora
 11th Military Service Circumscription (11ª Circunscrição de Serviço Militar) in Belo Horizonte
 12th Military Service Circumscription (12ª Circunscrição de Serviço Militar) in Juiz de Fora 
Brazilian Army NCO Academy (ESA) (Escola de Sargentos das Armas - ESA) in Três Corações
 Military High School Juiz de Fora (Colégio Militar de Juiz de Fora) in Juiz de Fora
 5th Engineer Group' (5º Grupamento de Engenharia) in Rio de Janeiro
 HQ Company 5th Engineer Group (Companhia de Comando do 5º Grupamento de Engenharia) in Rio de Janeiro
 1st Combat Engineer (Training) Battalion (1º Batalhão de Engenharia de Combate (Escola)) in Rio de Janeiro
 4th Combat Engineer Battalion (4º Batalhão de Engenharia de Combate) in Itajubá
 10th Construction Engineer Battalion (10º Batalhão de Engenharia de Construção) in Lages
 1st Army Division (1ª Divisão de Exército) in Rio de Janeiro
 HQ Company 1st Army Division (Companhia de Comando da 1ª Divisão de Exército) in Rio de Janeiro
 38th Infantry Battalion (38º Batalhão de Infantaria) in Vila Velha
 11th Military Police Battalion (11º Batalhão de Polícia do Exército) in Rio de Janeiro
 1st CBRN Defense Battalion (1º Batalhão de Defesa, Química, Biológica, Radiológica e Nuclear) in Rio de Janeiro
 21st Logistics Battalion (21º Batalhão Logístico) in Rio de Janeiro
 1st Division Artillery (Artilharia Divisionária da 1ª Divisão de Exército) in Niterói
 HQ Battery 1st Division Artillery (Bateria de Comando da Artilharia Divisionária da 1ª DE) in Niterói
 11th Field Artillery Group (11º Grupo de Artilharia de Campanha) in Rio de Janeiro
 14th Field Artillery Group (14º Grupo de Artilharia de Campanha) in Pouso Alegre
 21st Field Artillery Group (21º Grupo de Artilharia de Campanha) in Niterói
 Paratrooper Infantry Brigade (Brigada de Infantaria Pára-quedista) in Rio de Janeiro
 HQ Company Parachute Infantry Brigade (Companhia de Comando da Brigada de Infantaria Pára-quedista) in Rio de Janeiro
 25th Parachutist Infantry Battalion (25º Batalhão de Infantaria Pára-quedista) in Rio de Janeiro
 26th Parachutist Infantry Battalion (26º Batalhão de Infantaria Pára-quedista) in Rio de Janeiro
 27th Parachutist Infantry Battalion (27º Batalhão de Infantaria Pára-quedista) in Rio de Janeiro
 8th Parachutist Field Artillery Group (8º Grupo de Artilharia de Campanha Pára-quedista) in Rio de Janeiro
 20th Parachutist Logistics Battalion (20º Batalhão Logístico Pára-quedista) in Rio de Janeiro
 Parachutist Folding, Maintenance and Air Supply Battalion (Batalhão de Dobragem, Manutenção de Pára-quedas e Suprimento Pelo Ar) in Rio de Janeiro
 Parachutist Pathfinder Company (Companhia de Precursores Pára-quedista) in Rio de Janeiro
 1st Parachute Cavalry Squadron (1º Esquadrão de Cavalaria pára-quedista) in Rio de Janeiro
 21st Parachutist Air Defence Artillery Battery (21ª Bateria de Artilharia Anti-Aérea Pára-quedista) in Rio de Janeiro
 1st Parachutist Combat Engineer Company (1ª Companhia de Engenharia de Combate pára-quedista) in Rio de Janeiro
 20th Parachutist Signals Company (20ª Companhia de Comunicações Pára-quedista) in Rio de Janeiro
 36th Parachutist Military Police Platoon (36º Pelotão de Polícia do Exército Pára-quedista) in Rio de Janeiro 
 4th Light Infantry (Mountain) Brigade (4ª Brigada de Infantaria Leve (Montanha)) in Juiz de Fora
 HQ Company 4th Light Infantry (Mountain) Brigade (Companhia de Comando da 4ª Brigada de Infantaria Leve (Montanha)) in Juiz de Fora
 10th Light Infantry Battalion (10º Batalhão de Infantaria) in Juiz de Fora
 11th Mountain Infantry Battalion (11º Batalhão de Infantaria de Montanha) in São João Del Rei
 32nd Light Infantry Battalion (32º Batalhão de Infantaria Motorizado) in Petrópolis
 4th Light Field Artillery Group (4º Grupo de Artilharia de Campanha Leve) in Juiz de Fora
 17th Light Logistics Battalion (17º Batalhão Logístico Leve) in Juiz de Fora
 4th Mechanized Cavalry Squadron (4º Esquadrão de Cavalaria Mecanizado) in Santos Dumont
 4th Signals Company (4ª Companhia de Comunicações) in Belo Horizonte
 35th Military Police Platoon (35º Pelotão de Polícia do Exército) in Juiz de Fora
 Training Units Group/9th Motorized Infantry Brigade (Grupamento de Unidades-Escola/9ª Brigada de Infantaria Motorizada) in Rio de Janeiro
 HQ Company Training Units Group/9th Motorized Infantry Brigade (Companhia de Comando do Grupamento de Unidades-escola/9ª Brigada de Infantaria Motorizada) in Rio de Janeiro
 15th Mechanized Cavalry (Training) Regiment (15º Regimento de Cavalaria Mecanizado (Escola) ) in Rio de Janeiro
 1st Motorized Infantry (Training) Battalion (1º Batalhão de Infantaria Motorizado (escola)) in Rio de Janeiro
 2nd Motorized Infantry (Training) Battalion (2º Batalhão de Infantaria Motorizado (escola)) in Rio de Janeiro
 57th Motorized Infantry (Training) Battalion (57º Batalhão de Infantaria Motorizado (escola)) in Rio de Janeiro
 31st Field Artillery (Training) Group (31º Grupo de Artilharia de Campanha (Escola)) in Rio de Janeiro
 Signals Training Battalion (Batalhão Escola de Comunicações) in Rio de Janeiro
 25th Logistics (Training) Battalion (25º Batalhão Logístico (Escola)) in Rio de Janeiro
 2nd Infantry Company (2ª Companhia de Infantaria) in Campos dos Goytacazes
 9th Air Defence Artillery (Training) Battery (9ª Bateria de Artilharia Anti-Aérea (Escola)) in Macaé
 9th Military Police Platoon (9º Pelotão de Polícia do Exército'') in Rio de Janeiro

References

Commands of the Brazilian Armed Forces
Regional commands of the Brazilian Army